Cyrtodactylus zhenkangensis is a species of gecko that is endemic to China.

References

Cyrtodactylus
Reptiles described in 2021